Black money is income earned surreptitiously or illegally, usually in cash, and not reported to the government so as to avoid paying taxes on it.

Black money may also refer to:
 Black Money (novel), a novel by Ross Macdonald
 Black Money (film), a 2019 South Korean crime drama
 "Black Money", an early 1980s U.K. single by Culture Club (by way of romantic/aspirational analogy, the song thematically refers to surreptitiously earned income)
 Black money scam, a confidence trick
 Indian black money, connected to tax avoidance in the country
 Black money records, a record label owned by Digga D

See also
Dark money (disambiguation)